Henk Schouten (16 April 1932 – 18 April 2018) was a Dutch footballer who was active as a midfielder. Schouten made his debut at Excelsior Rotterdam and also played for Holland Sport and Feijenoord.

Schouten died of pancreatic cancer on 18 April 2018 at the age of 86.

Honours
 1960-61 : Eredivisie winner with Feijenoord
 1961-62 : Eredivisie winner with Feijenoord

References

 Profile

1932 births
2018 deaths
Dutch footballers
Eredivisie players
Feyenoord players
Excelsior Rotterdam players
ADO Den Haag players
Association football midfielders
Footballers from Rotterdam
Netherlands international footballers
Deaths from cancer in the Netherlands
Deaths from pancreatic cancer